The Solasteridae are a family of sea stars.

Genera
The following genera are listed in the World Register of Marine Species:
 Crossaster Müller and Troschel, 1840
 Heterozonias Fisher, 1910
 Laetmaster Fisher, 1908
 Lophaster Verrill, 1878
 Paralophaster Fisher, 1940
 Rhipidaster Sladen, 1889
 Seriaster Jangoux, 1984
 Solaster Forbes, 1839
 Xenorias Fisher, 1913

References

 
Echinoderm families